Erin Margaret Baker  (born 23 May 1961) is a former New Zealand triathlete.  She won many world championship and Ironman titles.

Early life
Baker was born in 1961 in Kaiapoi, New Zealand.  Upon the suggestion by her mother, Mary, Baker began running competitively at age 15 and showed ability right from the start. "I remember the first day Erin competed in a cross-country race. I was waiting for her to come in thinking God, she won't be very pleased because she hasn’t done very well. In fact, I missed her crossing the finish line a quarter of an hour earlier, in first place."

Baker is one of eight children. Her siblings include Philippa Baker (New Zealand rower and 1991 & 1994 Halberg award winner) and Kathy and Maureen who were both national titlists in swimming and aerobics.

Competitive career
Baker was originally coached by John Hellemans but controlled and developed her successful career by self-training, "I was self-trained. I just trained as much as my body would handle, and that was a shit load. I trained and trained, and I trained more if I had time. I never got injured so I would often do more in case somebody else was training while I was resting".

In 1981 she was convicted of throwing explosive devices while protesting during the South African Rugby team tour of New Zealand. This act prevented her from entering the United States for several years, restricting her from competing in any American competitions. Baker was also known for her protests at the Hawaii Ironman competitions when she rebelled against the notion of the winner of the men's division receiving a car and the women's division winner receiving nothing for her efforts. She voiced her opinions on numerous occasions and as a result was well known as a controversial athlete.

She finished her triathlon career in 1994 with a record of 104 wins from 121 triathlons entered.

Baker was named "Triathlete of the decade" by American magazine Triathlete. The magazine commented on her success by saying, "We’ve stopped trying to figure Erin out, we just accept her as the best female triathlete that ever lived".

In the 1993 New Year Honours, Baker was appointed a Member of the Order of the British Empire, for services as a triathlete.

Results
 1984 entered and won her first ever triathlon in Sydney
 1985 won the world middle-distance championship in Nice, France
 1986 New Zealand Ironman female winner (9:26.3)
 1986 Won the world middle-distance championship in Nice, France (Disqualified 8 hours post race due to rule infractions)
 1987 New Zealand Iron Man female winner (9:17.3)
 1987 Winner of female division at Ford Ironman championships in Hawaii (shattered previous course record)
 1987 Winner of the world short course title
 1988 Won the world middle-distance championship in Nice, France
 1988 Winner of the world short course title
 1988 Won World Championships (Olympic distance) in Canada
 1988 Winner of the world short course title
 1989 Named New Zealand Sportsperson of the year at Halberg awards
 1990 Won the Women's demonstration Triathlon at the 1990 Commonwealth Games; competed in Women's 10,000 m in National championships
 1990 Winner of female division at Ford Ironman championships in Hawaii
 1990 New Zealand Ironman female winner (9.38.3)
 1991 Won the World Duathlon title
 1994 New Zealand Ironman female winner (9.54.1)
 1994 Retired as a professional athlete
 1995 Inducted in the New Zealand Sports Hall of Fame
 Winner of 9 Ironman titles

Post triathlon career
Baker now lives in Christchurch, New Zealand with her husband and fellow triathlete Scott Molina. Together she and Molina (nicknamed Skid) have two children.

Baker has also served as a councillor on Christchurch City Council (resigned January 2004), and has served on Canterbury District Health Board and on the boards of Jade Stadium Ltd and Christchurch and Canterbury Marketing Ltd.

References

 Heidenstrom, Peter (1992) Athletes of the Century: 100 years of New Zealand track and field (GP Publications, Wellington)

External links
 New Zealand's Wonder Woman
 2004 Christchurch Election results
 Halberg Award

Ironman world champions
1961 births
Living people
New Zealand female triathletes
Sportspeople from Christchurch
People from Kaiapoi
Duathletes
Commonwealth Games competitors for New Zealand
Athletes (track and field) at the 1990 Commonwealth Games
Christchurch City Councillors
New Zealand Members of the Order of the British Empire
Canterbury District Health Board members
20th-century New Zealand women
21st-century New Zealand women